The Algerian ambassador in Washington, D. C. is the official representative of the Government in Algiers to the Government of the United States.

List of representatives

Algeria–United States relations

References 

 
United States
Algeria